Cuba first participated at the Olympic Games in 1900, and has sent athletes to compete in 20 of 28 Summer Olympic Games overall.

Cuban athletes have never participated in the Winter Olympic Games. Among those nations that have never participated at Winter Olympics, Cuba is the most successful Olympic team (by gold and total medals won).

Cuba is in the second position of American countries in Summer Olympics gold medals (trailing only the United States), and has won more medals than any nation in Latin America and Canada.  Cuba has yet to have hosted the Olympic Games. Cuba has won the fourth highest total number of medals (after Hungary, Romania, and Poland) of nations that have never hosted the Games and the highest number of medals amongst countries that have never medalled at the Winter Olympics.

The National Olympic Committee for Cuba is the Cuban Olympic Committee, and was created in 1926 and recognized in 1954.

Medals

Medals by Summer Games

Medals by Summer Sport

List of medalists since 2000

Summary by sport

Fencing

Cuba's Olympic debut in 1900 featured one fencer, Ramón Fonst, who won the men's amateur épée contest and finished second in the amateurs–masters event (behind a professional). Fonst would repeat as épée champion in 1904. The IOC credits Cuba with the other two medals in the 1904 épée event as well, despite Charles Tatham (silver) and Albertson Van Zo Post (bronze) being from the United States.

Boxing
Despite having a population of just over 11 million, Cuba has won the second highest amount of Olympic medals in boxing, with a total of 41 gold medals and 78 medals in total. The country's boxing culture, strong grassroots program, specialized training and support, and investment in sports infrastructure have all contributed to the development of world-class boxers.

See also
 :Category:Olympic competitors for Cuba
 List of flag bearers for Cuba at the Olympics

External links